Barthélémy Attisso (1945 – August 29, 2021) was a Togolese lawyer and self-taught guitarist, most famous for his work with Senegal-based Pan-African band Orchestra Baobab.

Biography

Attisso, born in 1944 or 1945, moved to Dakar in 1966 to study law at the University of Dakar.  He took up guitar to earn money, playing in the club scene and joining the Star Band. In the early 1970s he joined Orchestra Baobab, and rode the band's success into the 1980s. When the band disbanded in 1987, Attisso returned to Togo to practice law. He did not play the guitar until the 2001 reunion, and has recorded and toured with Orchestra Baobab ever since, although has also maintained his practice in Lomé.

References

1945 births
2021 deaths
Togolese musicians
Cheikh Anta Diop University alumni
Togolese lawyers
21st-century Togolese people
20th-century Togolese people